Bijan Djir-Sarai (born 6 June 1976) is a German politician of the Free Democratic Party (FDP) who has served as a member of the Bundestag from 2009 until 2013 and since 2017.

Background and education
Djir-Sarai was born on 6 June 1976 in Tehran. He was sent to Germany to live with an uncle at the age of 11 by his Iranian family.

Political career
Djir-Sarai joined the FDP in 1996. He first became a member of the German Parliament in the 2009 elections. From 2009 and 2013, he served on the Committee on Foreign Relations. In the 2013 elections, he lost his mandate.

Djir-Sarai was re-elected in the 2017 elections and has since been serving on the Committee on Foreign Affairs again. He serves as his parliamentary group's spokesperson on foreign policy. In addition to his committee assignments, he chairs the German-Iranian Parliamentary Friendship Group.

In the negotiations to form a so-called traffic light coalition of the Social Democratic Party (SPD), the Green Party and the FDP following the 2021 federal elections, Djir-Sarai was part of his party's delegation in the working group on foreign policy, defence, development cooperation and human rights, co-chaired by Heiko Maas, Omid Nouripour and Alexander Graf Lambsdorff. In April 2022 he was elected as the General Secretary of the FDP.

Other activities

Corporate boards
 Sparkasse Neuss, Member of the Supervisory Board

Non-profit organizations
 Europa-Union Deutschland (EUD), Member
 German Council on Foreign Relations (DGAP), Member of the Steering Committee

Political positions
Djir-Sarai opposes Boycott, Divestment and Sanctions (BDS) against Israel and favors the recognition of Hezbollah as a terrorist organization.

In a joint letter initiated by Norbert Röttgen and Anthony Gonzalez ahead of the 47th G7 summit in 2021, Djir-Sarai joined some 70 legislators from Europe and the US in calling upon their leaders to take a tough stance on China and to "avoid becoming dependent" on the country for technology including artificial intelligence and 5G.

Controversy
In 2011, the Internet platform VroniPlag Wiki documented numerous inadequately sourced passages in the thesis. The University of Cologne withdrew his doctoral degree on 5 March 2012, since scientific citation obligations had not been sufficiently considered.

References

Iranian emigrants to Germany
German people of Iranian descent
German politicians of Iranian descent
Jewish German politicians
People of Iranian-Jewish descent
Naturalized citizens of Germany
1976 births
Living people
Members of the Bundestag 2021–2025
Members of the Bundestag 2017–2021
Members of the Bundestag 2009–2013
Members of the Bundestag for the Free Democratic Party (Germany)
Members of the Bundestag for North Rhine-Westphalia